Agnes Ullmann (14 April 1927 – 25 February 2019) was a French microbiologist.

Biography
Ullmann received her doctorate in microbiology from the University of Budapest.  After a research visit to Institut Pasteur in 1958/59 working with Jacques Monod, she moved to France in 1960 with the support of Monod, who smuggled her and her husband over the Austria/Hungary border in a Hungarian caravan. With a grant from the Rockefeller Foundation she went to the laboratory of Monod at the Institut Pasteur, where she remained for the rest of her career.  There she became a professor, laboratory director and in 1982 a member of the Board of Directors.

Ullmann initially dealt with the effects of antibiotics at the Institut Pasteur and was able to elucidate, among other things, the mode of action of streptomycin (as an inhibitor of protein synthesis in bacteria). She also studied the effect of Second Messenger cAMP in the bacterial cell. In 1967 she showed that cAMP reverses catabolite repression in the bacterium E. coli. Later, she discovered another factor that boosts catabolite repression (catabolite modulator factor, or CMF).

Ullmann subsequently dealt with the mode of action of the whooping cough pathogen and its toxin. She showed that the toxin increases the cAMP production in the host cell and thus disturbs their metabolism. The ability of the toxin to provide other molecules with access to the attacked host cell also helped her to develop vaccines by coupling the genetically engineered whooping cough toxin with antigenic fragments that were to be immunized against.

In 2002 she received the Robert Koch Medal. She was an honorary member of the Hungarian Academy of Sciences and of the European Academy of Microbiology (EAM). EAM President Philippe Sansonetti recalled all her contributions to microbiology in the "I n memoriam Agnes Ullmann" 

In 1978, with André Lwoff, she published a collection of essays by Jacques Monod and she published two anthologies in memory of him.

Ullmann became a French citizen in 1966.

Works

External links 

Philippe Sansonetti (2019). "In memoriam Agnés Ullmann (1927-2019)", https://fems-microbiology.org/agnes-ullmann-1927-2019-c/

See also 
 Blue–white screen

References 

20th-century biologists
20th-century French scientists
20th-century French women scientists
Women microbiologists
French microbiologists
1927 births
2019 deaths
French people of Hungarian-Jewish descent